Make It Good is the third studio album released by British-Norwegian boy band A1. The album was released on 8 April 2002, leading on from the success of the lead single, "Caught in the Middle". In an attempt to reach the French market, the band recorded a French version of "Caught in the Middle", with singer Ève Angeli. This appeared as a bonus track on the album in France.

Background
The album was considered a change in style from their previous efforts, bringing a more adult sound, removing more of the electro-pop influenced tracks and replacing them with soft-rock tracks, laden with instruments and guitars.

Track listing

Charts

Year-end charts

Certifications

References

A1 (band) albums
2002 albums
Epic Records albums